Georges Bonhivers (born 2 March 1900, date of death unknown) was a Belgian footballer. He played in one match for the Belgium national football team in 1927.

References

External links
 

1900 births
Year of death missing
Belgian footballers
Belgium international footballers
Place of birth missing
Association football midfielders
R.F.C. Tilleur players